The 1932 Penn Quakers football team was an American football team that represented the University of Pennsylvania as an independent during the 1932 college football season. In its second season under head coach Harvey Harman, the team compiled a 6–2 record and outscored opponents by a total of 178 to 58. The team played its home games at Franklin Field in Philadelphia.

Stanley Sokolis was the team captain. George Munger played at the halfback position.

Schedule

References

Penn
Penn Quakers football seasons
Penn Quakers football